The 1950 New South Wales 100 was a motor race staged at the Mount Panorama Circuit, Bathurst, New South Wales, Australia on 10 April 1950.
It was organised by the Australian Sporting Car Club and was contested over 25 laps, a total distance of approximately 100 miles.
The race was staged on a handicap basis with the first car, the MG J2/P of RW Fowler, scheduled to start 25 minutes before the last car, the Alta of Tony Gaze.

The race was won by Doug Whiteford driving a Ford V8 Special.
Whiteford also achieved the fastest race time, for which he was awarded the New South Wales Road Racing Championship title.

Results

Notes
 Organiser: Australian Sporting Car Club
 Attendance: 30,000 (estimated)
 Entries: 48
 Starters: 37
 Non Starters: 11
 Finishers: 10
 Still running when time limit for race expired: 9
 Fastest lap: Jack Murray (Bugatti Ford): 3:08 (74.3 mph)

References

External links
 Motor races at Bathurst, The Sydney Morning Herald, Friday, 7 April 1950 page 2, as archived at trove.nla.gov.au
 Victorian first in big car race, The Sydney Morning Herald, Tuesday 11 April 1950, page 9, as archived at trove.nla.gov.au

New South Wales 100
Motorsport in Bathurst, New South Wales
New South Wales 100